Leitre is a Papuan language in the Skou family, spoken on the north coast of Papua New Guinea in the village of Leitre (Laitre) in Bewani-Wutung Onei Rural LLG, Sandaun Province.

See also
 Rawo language

References

Sources

Languages of Sandaun Province
Serra Hills languages